Construction Intervention is a program on the Discovery Channel in which host Charlie Frattini and his team save small business that are on the brink of closing due to bad contractors or botched construction. They then get to work, completing all aspects of construction in a mere four days, and give the owner back a brand new business, ready for the masses.

Episodes

External links
 
 Episode Guide for Construction Intervention at Discovery.com

Discovery Channel original programming